My Sweet Charlie is a 1970 American made-for-television drama film directed by Lamont Johnson. The teleplay by Richard Levinson and William Link is based on the novel of the same name by David Westheimer. Produced by Universal Television and broadcast by NBC on January 20, 1970, it later had a brief theatrical release. It is considered a landmark in television films. The film was made on location in Port Bolivar, Texas.

Synopsis
Set during the Civil Rights Movement, Charlie Roberts is a militant African American attorney from New York City falsely accused of murder during a demonstration in rural Texas.

Escaping from his captors, Charlie breaks into a vacant coastal vacation home, where he encounters white Marlene Chambers, an uneducated, prejudiced, unwed pregnant teenager who has been shunned by her father and boyfriend due to her pregnancy and who sought refuge in the vacant home a few weeks before Charlie arrives.

Realizing their survival depends upon their willingness to help each other, their relationship, at first defined by mutual contempt, prejudice, and hostility, slowly evolves into a touching friendship.

Production notes
In 1966, Westheimer adapted his novel for a play that opened at Broadway's Longacre Theatre with Bonnie Bedelia and Louis Gossett in the leading roles. It ran for 12 previews and 31 performances.

The television production was filmed on location in Port Bolivar, Texas in 1968 and was plagued by almost as many racial tensions as those depicted in the film. According to Patty Duke in her autobiography, her friendship with Freeman led to rumors of an affair. Marijuana was planted in Duke's Galveston hotel room by locals, though it was quickly determined not to belong to Duke. Texas governor John Connally intervened with local authorities to stop harassment of the production company and Duke.

Principal cast
 Patty Duke ..... Marlene Chambers
 Al Freeman Jr. ..... Charlie Roberts
 Ford Rainey ..... Treadwell

Principal production credits
 Producers ..... Bob Banner, Richard Levinson, William Link
 Original Music ..... Gil Melle
 Cinematography ..... Gene Polito
 Art Direction ..... Robert Luthardt
 Costume Design ..... Charles Waldo

Reception
The film earned very high ratings, with a Nielsen rating of 31.7, an audience share of 48% and a record audience for a TV movie with 18.5 million homes watching.

Awards and nominations
 Emmy Award for Outstanding Single Performance by an Actress in a Leading Role (Patty Duke, winner)
Emmy Award for Outstanding Writing Achievement in Drama (winner)
Emmy Award for Outstanding Achievement in Film Editing for Entertainment Programming - For a Special or Feature Length Program Made for Television (winner)
Emmy Award for Outstanding Single Performance by an Actor in a Leading Role (Al Freeman Jr., nominee)
Emmy Award for Outstanding Dramatic Program (nominee)
Emmy Award for Outstanding Directorial Achievement in Drama (nominee)
Emmy Award for Outstanding Achievement in Cinematography for Entertainment Programming - For a Special or Feature Length Program Made for Television (nominee)
Emmy Award for Outstanding Achievement in Film Sound Mixing (Roger Heman Jr., Melvin Metcalfe Sr., Clarence Self and John Stransky Jr., nominee)
 Image Award for Best Program of the Year (winner)
 Directors Guild of America Award for Outstanding Directorial Achievement in Television (winner)

References

External links

1970 television films
1970 films
1970 drama films
NBC network original films
Emmy Award-winning programs
Films directed by Lamont Johnson
Films based on American novels
Films shot in Texas
Films set in Texas
Universal Pictures films
American drama television films
1970s American films